The Royal Rota is the press pool that covers the British royal family. The Royal Rota is made up of a select group of media representatives that are invited to attend and report on royal events, with the understanding that the news and photographs taken at the event will be freely shared with other members of the media. This pool system decreases the number of media representatives that would otherwise attend, which helps to alleviate space and security concerns.

Members
The Royal Rota includes journalism staff affiliated with the following professional organisations:

News Media Association, which represents print journalism, including the Daily Express, the Daily Mail, the Daily Mirror, the Evening Standard, The Telegraph, The Times, and The Sun.
Wire Picture Agency
Council of Photographic News Agencies Limited
Independent Photographers Association
United Kingdom television broadcast networks, such as BBC, Sky News, and ITN

Core members 
, core members of the print media include the Daily Express, the Daily Mail, the Daily Mirror, the Evening Standard, The Telegraph, The Times and The Sun.

See also
Royal correspondent
White House Correspondents' Association – the press pool for the White House

References

External links
Royal Rota at newsmediauk.org

British royal family
Journalism-related professional associations
Professional associations based in the United Kingdom